White Cottage is an unincorporated community in central Newton Township, Muskingum County, Ohio, United States.  It has a post office with the ZIP code 43791. It lies along U.S. Route 22 between Zanesville and Lancaster.

A post office called White Cottage has been in operation since 1839. The community was named for a white tavern near the original town site.

References

Unincorporated communities in Ohio
Unincorporated communities in Muskingum County, Ohio
1839 establishments in Ohio
Populated places established in 1839